Don Owen may refer to:

Don Owen (wrestling) (1912–2002), American professional wrestling promoter
Don Owen (filmmaker) (1935–2016), Canadian filmmaker
Don Owen (news anchor) (1930–2012), American broadcast journalist and politician